Derrick Gore (born December 13, 1994) is an American football running back for the New Orleans Saints of the National Football League (NFL). He played college football at Louisiana–Monroe, Alabama and Coffeyville Community College.

College career
Gore began his collegiate career at Coffeyville Community College. He suffered an injury in training camp and missed his freshman season. Following the season, Gore transferred to Alabama after receiving an offer to join the team as a walk-on. He played mostly on special teams as a redshirt freshman as the Crimson tide won the 2015 National Championship As a redshirt sophomore, Gore rushed for 93 yards and one touchdown. After the season Gore announced his intent to transfer from Alabama and ultimately committed to transfer to Louisiana–Monroe for his final two seasons of NCAA eligibility.  He led the Warhawks in rushing in both seasons with 585 and 662 yards scored 13 total touchdowns.

Professional career

Los Angeles Chargers
Gore was signed by the Los Angeles Chargers as an undrafted free agent on July 24, 2019. Gore was released by the team on August 31, 2019, during final roster cuts. Gore was re-signed to the Chargers' practice squad on October 16, 2019, but was waived two days later.

Washington Redskins
Gore was signed to the Washington Redskins practice squad on December 10, 2019.

Los Angeles Chargers (second stint)
Gore was re-signed by the Chargers on May 5, 2020. He was waived at the end of training camp on September 5, 2020. He was re-signed to the Chargers' practice squad on November 16, 2020. The Chargers released Gore on December 4, 2020.

Kansas City Chiefs
Gore signed a reserve/futures contract with the Kansas City Chiefs on February 6, 2021. He was waived by the Chiefs during final roster cuts on August 30, 2021, and was re-signed to their practice squad on September 1 Gore was signed to the Chiefs active roster on October 12, 2021. He rushed for his first NFL touchdown on November 1, 2021, against the New York Giants on a halfback stretch run to the left front pylon in a 20–17 win.

On August 23, 2022, Gore was placed on injured reserve with a fractured thumb. He was released on August 25.

New Orleans Saints
On November 9, 2022, Gore was signed to the New Orleans Saints practice squad. He signed a reserve/future contract on January 9, 2023.

References

External links
 Alabama Crimson Tide bio
 Louisiana–Monroe Warhawks bio
 Kansas City Chiefs bio

1994 births
Living people
Players of American football from Syracuse, New York
American football running backs
Louisiana–Monroe Warhawks football players
Kansas City Chiefs players
Los Angeles Chargers players
Washington Redskins players
Alabama Crimson Tide football players
Coffeyville Red Ravens football players
Milford Academy alumni
Nottingham High School (Syracuse, New York) alumni
New Orleans Saints players